Ozark is a city in and the county seat of Dale County, Alabama. As of the 2010 census, the population of the city was 14,907.

Ozark is the principal city of the Ozark Micropolitan Statistical Area, as well as a part of the Dothan-Ozark Combined Statistical Area. Ozark was originally a part of Enterprise–Ozark micropolitan area before being split, and for a longer while was originally part of the Dothan-Enterprise-Ozark combined statistical area but Enterprise is now its own separate primary statistical area in later censuses. Fort Rucker, the primary flight training base for Army Aviation, abuts Ozark.

History
The Ozark area was originally inhabited by the Muscogee people. It is said that Ozark received its name after a traveler visited and was reminded of the Ozark Mountains in Arkansas.

The first known European settler in Ozark was John Merrick Sr., a veteran of the Revolutionary War, in 1822. In honor of him, the town was named Merricks. It was later changed to Woodshop, which was its name when the town received its post office. The first appearance of the name Ozark was in 1855, when the citizens requested a name change.

The county seat was moved from Newton to Ozark 1870.

Ozark is home to four sites listed on the National Register of Historic Places: the Claybank Log Church, the Samuel Lawson Dowling House, the Old Train Depot, and the J. D. Holman House.

Geography
Ozark is located at  (31.448169, -85.642009). It is part of the Wiregrass Region.

Major highways that run through the city include U.S. Route 231 and Alabama State Routes 27 and 249. US 231 runs northwest to southeast through the city, leading northwest  to Troy and southeast  to Dothan. SR 27 leads east  to Abbeville and southwest  to Enterprise.

Climate
According to the Köppen climate classification, Ozark has a humid subtropical climate (abbreviated Cfa).

Demographics

2010 census
At the 2010 census, there were 14,907 people, 6,209 households, and 4,064 families living in the city. The racial makeup of the city was 64.8% White, 30.2% Black or African American, 0.7% Native American, 0.9% Asian, 0.0% Pacific Islander, 0.8% from other races, and 2.6% from two or more races. 3.2% of the population were Hispanic or Latino of any race.

Of the 6,209 households 26.1% had children under the age of 18 living with them, 43.3% were married couples living together, 17.5% had a female householder with no husband present, and 34.5% were non-families. 30.5% of households were one person and 12.0% were one person aged 65 or older. The average household size was 2.35 and the average family size was 2.91.

The age distribution was 23.1% under the age of 18, 8.4% from 18 to 24, 23.1% from 25 to 44, 28.2% from 45 to 64, and 17.2% 65 or older. The median age was 41.2 years. For every 100 females, there were 90.7 males. For every 100 females age 18 and over, there were 92.6 males.

The median household income was $41,079 and the median family income was $52,061. Males had a median income of $41,513 versus $28,227 for females. The per capita income for the city was $22,103. About 13.6% of families and 18.4% of the population were below the poverty line, including 27.2% of those under age 18 and 14.4% of those age 65 or over.

2020 census

As of the 2020 United States census, there were 14,368 people, 5,946 households, and 3,651 families residing in the city.

Education
Ozark is served by the Ozark City Schools. Schools located in the city are Carroll High School (grades 9 through 12), Carroll Career Center (grades 9 through 12), D.A. Smith Middle School (grades 6 through 8), Harry N. Mixon Intermediate School (grades 3 through 5), and Joseph W. Lisenby Primary School (grades k through 2.)

Dale County School District is headquartered in Ozark, but does not include Ozark.

There is one private school in Ozark, Harvest Christian School for K-12.

Post-secondary education is available at Enterprise State Community College's Alabama Aviation Center at Ozark. Programs are offered in aviation maintenance technology.

Media

Radio stations
WDBT 103.9 FM (News/Talk)
WOAB 104.9 FM (Adult standards)
WOZK 900 AM (MOR)

Newspaper
The Southern Star- weekly

Notable people
 Steve Clouse, state representative
 Larry Donnell, tight end for the New York Giants
 Wilbur Jackson, National Football League
 Meg McGuffin, Miss Alabama 2015
 Steve McLendon, nose tackle/defensive end, Pittsburgh Steelers
 Byron Mitchell, former super middleweight boxing champion
Marc Ronan, Major League Baseball catcher
 Naseeb Saliba, co-founder of Tutor-Saliba Corporation
 Josh Savage, professional football player

See also
Ozark Civic Center

References

External links

Populated places established in 1822
Cities in Alabama
Cities in Dale County, Alabama
Enterprise–Ozark micropolitan area
County seats in Alabama
1822 establishments in Alabama